Vicky Theresine is a member of the National Assembly of Seychelles.  A teacher by profession, she is a member of the Seychelles People's Progressive Front, and was first elected to the Assembly on a proportional basis in 2007.

References
Member page on Assembly website

Year of birth missing (living people)
Living people
Members of the National Assembly (Seychelles)
United Seychelles Party politicians
Seychellois women in politics
21st-century women politicians
Place of birth missing (living people)